Concord Parish is one of the 57 parishes of Cumberland County, New South Wales, a cadastral unit for use on land titles. It is located to the south of the Parramatta River between Homebush Bay and Iron Cove; and to the north of Cooks River. It includes the suburbs of Homebush (but not Homebush West), most of Strathfield, Burwood, Croydon, Concord, Canada Bay,  Abbotsford and Drummoyne. It covers the local government areas of City of Canada Bay and the Municipality of Burwood and most of the Municipality of Strathfield (excluding the western part of the municipality that was incorporated in 1892). It roughly corresponds to the western half of the Inner West region, with the neighbouring Parish of Petersham making up the eastern half.

References

Parishes of Cumberland County